The pale ghost shark (Hydrolagus bemisi) is a shortnose chimaera of the family Chimaeridae. It is endemic to New Zealand waters.

Taxonomy 
This species was first described by Dominique A. Didier in 2002. Although it had been recognised, the description of this species was regarded as being important because of the increase in the commercial fishing of chimaera.

Description 
Estimations of growth and age have only been attempted for a quarter of the species known. This species has a medium-sized body with a tapered whip-like tail. Its length is up to 1.12 m. It can be distinguished from H. novaezealandiae and H. homonycteris as it has a pale silvery colour with no patternation or spots. Estimates suggest that they can live between 15–22 years, although the lack of data still makes this unreliable.

Distribution 
This species is endemic to New Zealand and can commonly be found from the West Norfolk Ridge to the Campbell Plateau at depths of between 400 and 1100 m.

Conservation status 
In June 2018 the New Zealand Department of Conservation classified the pale ghost shark as "Not Threatened" with the qualifier "Conservation Dependent " under the New Zealand Threat Classification System.

References

pale ghost shark
Endemic marine fish of New Zealand
Taxa named by Dominique A. Didier Dagit
pale ghost shark